More Than a Game: The Story of Cricket's Early Years (2007: HarperCollins) is a book about the history of cricket written by former British prime minister Sir John Major.

References

John Major
2007 non-fiction books
Cricket books
Books written by prime ministers of the United Kingdom